is a national highway of Japan connecting the cities of Morioka, the capital city of Iwate Prefecture, and Hirakawa in southern Aomori Prefecture.

Route description
National Route 282's starting point and southern terminus is located at an intersection along National Route 4, about half of a kilometer east of Iwate University. From there, it runs north concurrently with national routes 4 and 281 and crosses in to the city of Takizawa where it leaves the concurrency. From Takizawa northeast to its northern terminus in Hirakawa, it travels northwest parallel to the Tōhoku Expressway. It crosses briefly through Akita Prefecture before terminating at a junction with National Route 7 in Hirakawa in Aomori Prefecture.

History
National Route 282 was established by the Cabinet of Japan in 1970 between Morioka and Ōdate in Akita Prefecture. It was extended north to its current terminus in Hirakawa in 1982. A bypass signed as National Route 282 running to the east of its original route through Nishine, Iwate was completed on 1 April 2016.

Gallery

Major intersections
All junctions listed are at-grade intersections unless noted otherwise.

See also

References

External links

National highways in Japan
Roads in Akita Prefecture
Roads in Aomori Prefecture
Roads in Iwate Prefecture